Kassoum Ouédraogo (born 12 April 1966), sometimes spelled as Kassoum Quedraogo, is a Burkinabé former professional footballer who played as a forward. He played internationally for the Burkina Faso national team and at the club level with German clubs Darmstadt 98, FC Hessen Kassel, VfL Osnabrück, FSV Frankfurt and United Arab Emirates club Al Wasl FC.

Career
Ouédraogo first moved abroad to join Tunisian club Espérance Sportive de Tunis from Étoile Filante de Ouagadougou.

He continued his career in Europe where, after playing for Belgian side Eendracht Aalst, he signed with 2. Bundesliga club Darmstadt 98. Having become a fan favourite at FC Hessen Kassel, he joined another 2. Bundesliga club in FSV Frankfurt. His spell at FSV Frankfurt was not successful, and Ouédraogo signed for VfL Osnabrück. His started well at Osnabrück scoring 11 goals in pre-season and five goals in his first two league appearances. He scored just twice in the rest of the season and was demoted to the club's second team in the second half of the season. He ended his career after a season in the United Arab Emirates with Al Wasl FC.

References

External links
 
 

1966 births
Living people
Burkinabé footballers
Association football forwards
Burkina Faso international footballers
1998 African Cup of Nations players
2. Bundesliga players
UAE Pro League players
Étoile Filante de Ouagadougou players
Espérance Sportive de Tunis players
S.C. Eendracht Aalst players
SV Darmstadt 98 players
KSV Hessen Kassel players
FSV Frankfurt players
VfL Osnabrück players
Al-Wasl F.C. players
Burkinabé expatriate footballers
Burkinabé expatriate sportspeople in Tunisia
Expatriate footballers in Tunisia
Burkinabé expatriate sportspeople in Belgium
Expatriate footballers in Belgium
Burkinabé expatriate sportspeople in Germany
Expatriate footballers in Germany
Burkinabé expatriate sportspeople in the United Arab Emirates
Expatriate footballers in the United Arab Emirates
21st-century Burkinabé people